The 2010 JSM Challenger of Champaign–Urbana was a professional tennis tournament played on hard courts. It was the ninth edition of the tournament which was part of the 2010 ATP Challenger Tour. It took place in Champaign, United States between 15 and 21 November 2010.

ATP entrants

Seeds

 Rankings are as of November 8, 2010.

Other entrants
The following players received wildcards into the singles main draw:
  Amer Delić
  Steve Johnson
  Dennis Nevolo
  Abraham Souza

The following players received a Special Exempt into the singles main draw:
  Nicholas Monroe
  Fritz Wolmarans

The following players received entry from the qualifying draw:
  Andrew Anderson
  Chris Eaton
  John Paul Fruttero
  Luka Gregorc

Champions

Singles

 Alex Bogomolov Jr. def.  Amer Delić, 5–7, 7–6(7), 6–3

Doubles

 Raven Klaasen /  Izak van der Merwe def.  Ryler DeHeart /  Pierre-Ludovic Duclos, 4–6, 7–6(2), [10–4]

External links
Official Website
ITF Search 
ATP official site

JSM Challenger of Champaign-Urbana
JSM Challenger of Champaign–Urbana
JSM Challenger of Champaign-Urbana
JSM Challenger of Champaign-Urbana
JSM Challenger of Champaign-Urbana